A whole sky camera is a specialized camera used in meteorology and astronomy for capturing a photograph of the entire sky. Another application is that of hemispherical photography to study plant canopy geometry and to calculate near-ground solar radiation.

Development

Whole sky cameras typically use a fisheye lens that takes in an extremely wide, hemispherical image. Such lenses were originally developed for use in meteorology.

However, alternative techniques are based on the photography of a mirror-like hemisphere which are more common.
One of the first reported whole sky cameras was based on a series of pictures with lenses inclined to the horizon at an altitude of 45 degrees. With a lens that covers an angular field of 90 degrees, such camera revolves about a vertical axis.

Meteorological applications
In meteorological applications, whole sky cameras are used to study cloud cover, the current level of UV radiation, fractional cloud coverage, sky polarization, the computation of cloud base height and wind speed at cloud heights. Other uses include creating time-lapse photography of clouds. Whole sky cameras may be equipped with a sun tracking device to block sunlight which is too bright for the typical dynamic range of photographs. Sun tracking allows for reliable estimates of cloud fractional coverage, including cover in the part of the sky close to the Sun. There are techniques such as HDR which permit the taking of high dynamic range photographs without a sun tracker.

Cloud stereoscopy
Whole sky cameras in stereo configurations can be used to derive cloud base height and cloud base motion. The first work on this application of photogrammetry was done in 1896.

Notes and references

Images

Meteorological instrumentation and equipment